A hyperelastic or Green elastic material is a type of constitutive model for ideally elastic material for which the stress–strain relationship derives from a strain energy density function. The hyperelastic material is a special case of a Cauchy elastic material.

For many materials, linear elastic models do not accurately describe the observed material behaviour. The most common example of this kind of material is rubber, whose stress-strain relationship can be defined as non-linearly elastic, isotropic and incompressible. Hyperelasticity provides a means of modeling the stress–strain behavior of such materials. The behavior of unfilled, vulcanized elastomers often conforms closely to the hyperelastic ideal. Filled elastomers and biological tissues are also often modeled via the hyperelastic idealization.

Ronald Rivlin and Melvin Mooney developed the first hyperelastic models, the Neo-Hookean and Mooney–Rivlin solids. Many other hyperelastic models have since been developed. Other widely used hyperelastic material models include the Ogden model and the Arruda–Boyce model.

Hyperelastic material models

Saint Venant–Kirchhoff model 
The simplest hyperelastic material model is the Saint Venant–Kirchhoff model which is just an extension of the geometrically linear elastic material model to the geometrically nonlinear regime. This model has the general form and the isotropic form respectively

The strain-energy density function for the Saint Venant–Kirchhoff model is

and the second Piola–Kirchhoff stress can be derived from the relation

Classification of hyperelastic material models 
Hyperelastic material models can be classified as:

 phenomenological descriptions of observed behavior
 Fung
 Mooney–Rivlin
 Ogden
 Polynomial
 Saint Venant–Kirchhoff
 Yeoh
 Marlow
 mechanistic models deriving from arguments about underlying structure of the material
 Arruda–Boyce model
 Neo–Hookean model
 Buche–Silberstein model
 hybrids of phenomenological and mechanistic models
 Gent
 Van der Waals

Generally, a hyperelastic model should satisfy the Drucker stability criterion.
Some hyperelastic models satisfy the Valanis-Landel hypothesis which states that the strain energy function can be separated into the sum of separate functions of the principal stretches :

Stress–strain relations

Compressible hyperelastic materials

First Piola–Kirchhoff stress 
If  is the strain energy density function, the 1st Piola–Kirchhoff stress tensor can be calculated for a hyperelastic material as

where  is the deformation gradient. In terms of the Lagrangian Green strain

In terms of the right Cauchy–Green deformation tensor

Second Piola–Kirchhoff stress 
If  is the second Piola–Kirchhoff stress tensor then

In terms of the Lagrangian Green strain

In terms of the right Cauchy–Green deformation tensor

The above relation is also known as the Doyle-Ericksen formula in the material configuration.

Cauchy stress 
Similarly, the Cauchy stress is given by

In terms of the Lagrangian Green strain

In terms of the right Cauchy–Green deformation tensor

The above expressions are valid even for anisotropic media (in which case, the potential function is understood to depend implicitly on reference directional quantities such as initial fiber orientations). In the special case of isotropy, the Cauchy stress can be expressed in terms of the left Cauchy-Green deformation tensor as follows:

Incompressible hyperelastic materials 
For an incompressible material . The incompressibility constraint is therefore . To ensure incompressibility of a hyperelastic material, the strain-energy function can be written in form:

where the hydrostatic pressure  functions as a Lagrangian multiplier to enforce the incompressibility constraint. The 1st Piola–Kirchhoff stress now becomes

This stress tensor can subsequently be converted into any of the other conventional stress tensors, such as the Cauchy stress tensor which is given by

Expressions for the Cauchy stress

Compressible isotropic hyperelastic materials 
For isotropic hyperelastic materials, the Cauchy stress can be expressed in terms of the invariants of the left Cauchy–Green deformation tensor (or right Cauchy–Green deformation tensor). If the strain energy density function is  then

(See the page on the left Cauchy–Green deformation tensor for the definitions of these symbols).

Incompressible isotropic hyperelastic materials 
The Cauchy stress is then given by

where  is an undetermined pressure. In terms of stress differences

If in addition , then

If , then

Consistency with linear elasticity 
Consistency with linear elasticity is often used to determine some of the parameters of hyperelastic material models. These consistency conditions can be found by comparing Hooke's law with linearized hyperelasticity at small strains.

Consistency conditions for isotropic hyperelastic models 
For isotropic hyperelastic materials to be consistent with isotropic linear elasticity, the stress–strain relation should have the following form in the infinitesimal strain limit:

where  are the Lamé constants. The strain energy density function that corresponds to the above relation is

For an incompressible material  and we have

For any strain energy density function  to reduce to the above forms for small strains the following conditions have to be met

If the material is incompressible, then the above conditions may be expressed in the following form.

These conditions can be used to find relations between the parameters of a given hyperelastic model and shear and bulk moduli.

Consistency conditions for incompressible  based rubber materials 
For such materials we have .
The consistency conditions for incompressible materials for  may then be expressed as

The second consistency condition above can be derived by noting that

These relations can then be substituted into the consistency condition for isotropic incompressible hyperelastic materials.

References

See also 
Cauchy elastic material
Continuum mechanics
Deformation (mechanics)
Finite strain theory
Ogden–Roxburgh model
Rubber elasticity
Stress measures
Stress (mechanics)

Continuum mechanics
Elasticity (physics)
Rubber properties
Solid mechanics